Folkert Lútsen Idsinga (born 22 December 1971) is a Dutch tax lawyer and politician of the conservative liberal People's Party for Freedom and Democracy (VVD). He was a partner at Baker McKenzie and has been serving as a member of the House of Representatives since the 2021 general election.

Early life and career 
Idsinga was born in 1971 in the Friesland village Bakkeveen and studied fiscal economics at the University of Groningen, graduating in 1996. He worked for the accounting firm Arthur Andersen until he took a job at the law firm Baker & McKenzie in 2002. Idsinga was specialized in value-added tax and became a partner in 2004. He was promoted to joint managing partner and co-chair of the board of directors of the company's Amsterdam office in July 2015. Idsinga stopped being managing partner in 2018 but kept working at Baker McKenzie as a partner.

Politics 
Idsinga ran for member of parliament in the 2021 general election as the VVD's 33rd candidate. He was elected, receiving 483 preference votes, and was sworn into the House of Representatives on 31 March. His specializations are tax affairs, financial relations between the national government and decentralized governments, export credit insurance and facilities, Holland Casino, the Dutch Lottery, currency, and Domains Movable Property. Idsinga is a member of the German, British, and American parliamentary contact groups, and he is on the Committees for Defence, Digital Affairs, Finance, and Public Expenditure.

Personal life 
Idsinga resides in the Dutch capital Amsterdam.

References 

1971 births
21st-century Dutch politicians
Dutch fiscal jurists
People's Party for Freedom and Democracy politicians
Lawyers from Amsterdam
Living people
Members of the House of Representatives (Netherlands)
People associated with Baker McKenzie
People from Opsterland
University of Groningen alumni
Politicians from Amsterdam